Polydactyly-myopia syndrome, also known as Czeizel-Brooser syndrome, is a very rare genetic disorder which is characterized by post-axial polydactyly on all 4 limbs and progressive myopia. Additional symptoms include bilateral congenital inguinal hernia and undescended testes. It has only been described in nine members of a 4-generation Hungarian family in the year 1986. This disorder is inherited in an autosomal dominant manner.

References 

Genetics